Volodymyr Tyahlo (24 June 1947 – 3 July 2021) was a Ukrainian politician.

Biography
In 1970, he graduated from the Kharkiv Petro Vasylenko National Technical University of Agriculture. That year, he became an assistant foreman on a tractor crew, but subsequently became chief engineer on a collective farm in the Lozova Raion. He was head of the farm from 1981 to 1986.

As a member of the Communist Party of the Soviet Union (CPSU), Tyahlo served in the party's 20th Congress of the Lozova Raion. In 1986, he was elected Second Secretary of the Communist Party in Lozova and represented the city on the party's executive committee from 1987 to 1990. In March 1990, he was elected to serve on the Kharkiv Oblast Council. On 21 April 1992, he was elected to serve as the council's Chairman. However, he returned to the Kharkiv Oblast Council in 1998, once again serving as Chairman until February 2002.

On 2 February 2002, Tyahlo was appointed Ambassador of Ukraine to Armenia by President Leonid Kuchma. He was relieved of his duties on 21 June 2005. From August 2005 to January 2008, he was Ambassador of Ukraine to Kyrgyzstan.

Volodymyr Tyahlo died in Kharkiv on 3 July 2021 at the age of 74.

Awards
Order of the Badge of Honour
Order of Merit of Ukraine
Honorary Diploma of the Cabinet of Ministers of Ukraine (2001)

References

1947 births
2021 deaths
Ukrainian politicians
Ambassadors of Ukraine to Armenia
Ambassadors of Ukraine to Kyrgyzstan
Communist Party of the Soviet Union members
Kharkiv Petro Vasylenko National Technical University of Agriculture alumni
People from Kharkiv Oblast
Chevaliers of the Order of Merit (Ukraine)
Recipients of the Honorary Diploma of the Cabinet of Ministers of Ukraine